Wacławów may refer to the following places:
Wacławów, Piotrków County in Łódź Voivodeship (central Poland)
Wacławów, Sieradz County in Łódź Voivodeship (central Poland)
Wacławów, Radom County in Masovian Voivodeship (east-central Poland)
Wacławów, Zwoleń County in Masovian Voivodeship (east-central Poland)
Wacławów, Greater Poland Voivodeship (west-central Poland)